The Tacoma Open Invitational was a golf tournament on the PGA Tour that was played in 1948 and won by Ed Oliver in a one-hole playoff with Cary Middlecoff after the two had survived a five-man, 18-hole playoff — the first in tour history. Oliver eagled the final playoff hole; Middlecoff birdied it. Byron Nelson, who in 1945 won a record-setting 18 tournaments including 11 consecutively, ended up tied for ninth in the tournament — his worst finish of the year.  In 1945, the event played as the Tacoma Open and was won by Jimmy Hines by one stroke over Harold "Jug" McSpaden.

Both events were held at Fircrest Golf Club, an 18-hole, par-71 private club located just west of Tacoma. Construction on the course began in 1923 under the direction of Arthur Vernon Macan. It opened in 1924. Fircrest hosted the Carling Open Invitational in 1960.

Winners

References

Former PGA Tour events
Golf in Washington (state)
Sports in Tacoma, Washington